Don't Marry for Money is a 1923 American silent drama film directed by Clarence Brown and starring House Peters, Rubye De Remer, and Aileen Pringle.

Synopsis
A woman marries a millionaire, but finds her new life does not satisfy her romantic ambitions. She begins a flirtation with another man, not realising that he specialises in compromising wealthy woman and then blackmailing them. Her husband eventually rescues her in time.

Cast

References

Bibliography
 McCaffrey, Donald W. & Jacobs, Christopher P. Guide to the Silent Years of American Cinema. Greenwood Publishing, 1999. 
 Munden, Kenneth White. The American Film Institute Catalog of Motion Pictures Produced in the United States, Part 1. University of California Press, 1997.

External links
 
 

1923 films
1923 drama films
1920s English-language films
American silent feature films
Silent American drama films
Films directed by Clarence Brown
Preferred Pictures films
1920s American films